Samuel L. Cootes (1792–1882) was a prominent merchant, magistrate, and lawyer in Rockingham County, Virginia.  The town of Cootes Store takes its name from his place of business.  Cootes was a Democrat, and represented the area in the Virginia House of Delegates for a time.

References
Obituary from the Rockingham Register, published March 23, 1882

1792 births
1882 deaths
People from Rockingham County, Virginia
Democratic Party members of the Virginia House of Delegates
Virginia lawyers
Businesspeople from Virginia
19th-century American politicians
19th-century American businesspeople
19th-century American lawyers